Fanny Bay is a small hamlet in the Canadian province of British Columbia. It is located on Baynes Sound on the east coast of Vancouver Island. In 2001, its population was listed as 815. It is best known for its fine oysters. The area is served by the Island Highway and Island Rail Corridor.

Origin of the name
There is no consensus on the origin of the name Fanny Bay and none of the various explanations — comical, romantic, local or historical — can be considered without skepticism. The name first appeared on British Columbia maps in 1913 and was officially adopted by the government in 1923. This adoption was based on British Admiralty charts of the 1860s, taken from surveys by Royal Navy Captain G.H. Richards. However, if Capt. Richards knew who "Fanny" was, he did not record the information. Geographer A.B. McNeill wrote in his book Origin of Station Names, Esquimalt and Nanaimo Division that "...Fanny Bay was named after a sea captain who lived in this vicinity"; however, no dates or any other supporting information are provided. A popular and persistent local theory holds that Fanny Bay was named by Captain George Vancouver in 1792. However, Capt. Vancouver's nautical charts and journals only describe the east side of the nearest body of water, the Strait of Georgia (including Texada Island). There was only a rough outline of the eastern shore of Vancouver Island between Nanaimo and Comox, and his charts omitted several nearby islands and other features.

Fanny Bay may have been named after Francis "Fanny" Palmer, the daughter of a popular Victoria family who ran a music and dance studio. Fanny perished in the sinking of the Pacific off Cape Flattery on November 4, 1875, at the age of 18. The Palmer family had a number of daughters who were accomplished singers, and their home was at the centre of the social circle in early Victoria.

Shellfish
Fanny Bay is well known as a source of farmed shellfish, specifically Pacific oysters (scientific name Crassostrea gigas), manila clams (Venerupis philippinarum), savoury clams (Nuttallia obscurata) and mussels (Mytilus galloprovincialis), for both domestic and global markets. 

Oysters were introduced to the area as early as 1912 or 1913, with further seedings around 1925. As a result of the lack of Pacific oysters from Japan during World War II, further seeding occurred in 1942 (along with seedings in other parts of the Strait of Georgia).

Eikichi Kagetsu introduced 9 crates of oyster seed from Japan around 1926-1927 In the 1930s they received permission from the E&N Railway to use 10 acres along the shore to develop oyster culture. This was interrupted by the internment of Eikichi Kagetsu during World War II as the Canadian government confiscated all of his property and businesses. [7] https://onlineacademiccommunity.uvic.ca/press/books/titles/tree-trunk-pillow/ p46-47  

Oyster and clam seeding in Baynes Sound at Fanny Bay occurred about 1947, by Joseph McLellan, a pioneer in oyster aquaculture.  McLellan imported his first batch of oyster seed from Japan and seeded the beach areas around Fanny Bay -  Mud Bay, Ship Point, Buckley Bay and Denman Island. His work started what is now a primary industry in the South Coast of British Columbia, Canada, employing over one hundred people and contributing significantly to the economy of the Baynes Sound region.

McLellan's descendants still own and operate the oyster and clam farm located in Fanny Bay, Mac's Oysters Ltd.  A fourth-generation family shellfish farm, Mac's Oysters is the only shellfish processor situated in Fanny Bay, though there is another company by that name, located in Union Bay approximately 11 km to the north. Mac's Oysters is a significant player in the Canadian farmed shellfish industry, processing approximately 34% of all of British Columbia's farmed oysters and clams from this area.

Within food circles Fanny Bay is synonymous with oysters. Manila clam seed was inadvertently included in Joseph McLellan's initial seed shipments from Japan. The manila clam is as important as oysters to British Columbia's shellfish economy.

References

External links

Populated places on the British Columbia Coast
Unincorporated settlements in British Columbia
Populated places in the Comox Valley Regional District
Designated places in British Columbia